The FIBA U18 Women's African Championship is an under-18 basketball championship in the International Basketball Federation's FIBA Africa zone. The tournament is held biennially. The top two teams qualify directly to the FIBA Under-19 Women's World Cup.

Summary

 The Senegalese Basketball Federation relinquished the 2012 title due to age fraud by some of its players.

Medal table

MVP Awards

Participating nations

Under-19 Women's World Cup record

Top ten FIBA Youth Africa teams
Updated as of 1 January 2022 

C Current Africa champion

See also
 FIBA Women's African Championship
 FIBA U16 Women's African Championship
 FIBA Africa Under-20 Championship for Women

References

External links
 - africabasket.com
 - FIBA Archives

 
Women's basketball competitions in Africa between national teams
Africasia